Thondrangi is a village in Vizianagaram district of the Indian state of Andhra Pradesh. It is located in Garividi mandal.

References 

Villages in Vizianagaram district